A linear park is a type of park that is significantly longer than it is wide. These linear parks are strips of public land running along canals, rivers, streams, defensive walls, electrical lines, or highways and shorelines. Examples of linear parks include everything from wildlife corridors to riverways to trails, capturing the broadest sense of the word. Other examples include rail trails ("rails to trails"), which are disused railroad beds converted for recreational use by removing existing structures. Commonly, these linear parks result from the public and private sectors acting on the dense urban need for open green space. Linear parks stretch through urban areas, coming through as a solution for the lack of space and need for urban greenery. They also effectively connect different neighborhoods in dense urban areas as a result, and create places that are ideal for activities such as jogging or walking.  Linear parks may also be categorized as greenways. In Australia, a linear park along the coast is known as a foreshoreway. When being designed, linear parks appear unique as they are planned around the public's opinion of how the space will affect them.

North America
This system of linear parks was designed by Frederick Law Olmsted to connect the Boston Commons and Public Garden (1837) to Franklin Park (Boston), also known as the "crown jewel" of Olmstead's work in Boston. The project began around 1878 with efforts to clean up and control the marshy area which later became the Back Bay and the Fens. In 1880, Olmsted proposed that the Muddy River be included in the park plan as the current dredged into a winding stream and was directed into the Charles River. Olmsted's vision of a linear park of walking paths along a gentle stream connecting numerous small ponds was complete by the turn of the century, but never completed the section to Boston Harbor. The subsequent development of the automobile industry and roads severely disrupted the original concept.

In recent years, a prevalent example of a linear park that has seen more visitors is the High Line in New York City. The High Line is a 1.45-mile long rail trail and greenway, having been built on a historic rail line as well as constructed to have greenery all throughout. It serves its purpose as a linear park by connecting neighborhoods throughout while appearing aesthetically pleasing. Historically targeted for demolition, the High Line has been transformed into an extraordinary elevated park that allows for activities such as sight-seeing and exercise, creating a new dynamic living experience within the city. Overcoming demolition as an unused industrialized area, the ingenuity of the High Line has fast become motivation for other cities to follow suit and build smarter. Notably, the High Line's annual budget is funded almost entirely by park-goers, though it is operated under the New York City Department of Parks and Recreation license agreement.

In some cities, many linear parks run through residential areas. In this case, the front of the house will face the streets, while the back faces a small linear park containing a pathway, trees and grass connecting different areas together. Examples are numerous in some Canadian cities such as Saskatoon. Houses connected with linear parks are more common in suburban and rural areas where space is much less in-demand.

Equity and Inclusion 
A linear park system advocating for equity and inclusion is the BeltLine, currently being planned and built in sections in Atlanta, Georgia. Similar to the High Line, part of the foundation for this project consisted of reclaiming 22-miles(35.4 km) of historic and unused rail trails. Totaling 33-miles, the BeltLine will completely encircle Atlanta's central business districts, including a trail and light rail line on the existing tracks instead of another road. The mission and vision of Atlanta's BeltLine is to geographically balance out resident demographics within the city, allowing for all associated to the BeltLine to benefit and prosper economically.

Europe 

In England, linear parks have also been created around waterways, especially in cities where the terrain is such that rivers and brooks have significant flood plains. Such land cannot sensibly be used for urban development and so it is set aside as a civic amenity. The settlement Milton Keynes makes extensive use of linear parks, with nine different examples that include the flood plains of the Great Ouse and of its tributaries (the Ouzel and some brooks). In the UK, Milton Keynes ranked highest in a national comparison of open urban areas available to residents.

Greater London's largest park, Lee Valley Park is more than four times the size of Richmond Park, extending beyond Greater London's borders into the neighboring counties of Hertfordshire and Essex.

A more recent example of a linear park is the Berlin Mauerpark, which was built on a part of the former Berlin Wall area and its adjacent former death strip.

Planty Park, Kraków, Poland). It encircles the Stare Miasto (Old Town), where the Medieval city walls used to stand until the early 19th century. It consists of a chain of thirty smaller gardens designed in varied styles and adorned with numerous monuments and fountains. The park forms a scenic walkway popular with Cracovians. In summer, sprinkled with ponds and refreshment stalls, it is a cool and shady retreat from the nearby bustling streets.

Asia 

In Hong Kong, a prominent example of a linear park is the Avenue of Stars. Located at the waterfront surrounding East Tsim Sha Tsui, the Avenue of Stars is a 440-meter(0.27 mi.) promenade offering scenic views to the public. As a public amenity, the park provides much needed urban space to the dense city of Hong Kong. The walking road itself is dedicated to famous Hong Kong celebrities, and as such is an attractive tourist area lined with souvenir stalls at some sections.

In addition to the dynamic waterfront location, the Avenue of Stars provides visitors a "front-row seat"(stand) to the Symphony of Lights, the world's largest light and sound show. It's also around this area that the famed Star Ferry can be observed and even ridden.

In Singapore, wild growth and shrubbery that's taken over a former KTM rail line has been encouraged and maintained through public opinion. Convincing the Singaporean government of the land's value, the citizens of Singapore were able to turn a neglected KTM railway in to a linear park that now runs 10 km(6.21 mi) long and offers unique perspectives into Singaporean wildlife. Rail Corridor differs from the typical linear park in a way that promotes and integrates the biodiversity and ecosystem throughout—covering 93 different species—while serving as an excellent outdoor trail to get active in.

List of linear parks

Europe

Belgium 

 Parc de la Senne - Zennepark, Brussels

France
 Promenade plantée, Paris

Germany
 Mauerpark in Berlin
 Mittellandkanal, Hannover
 Kattenbrook-Park, Hannover

Ireland
 Dodder Park, Dublin
 Lansdowne Valley Park, Dublin

Portugal
 Tagus Linear Park, Póvoa de Santa Iria (River Tagus)

Spain
 Sagera Linear Park, Barcelona
 Parc de la Rambla de Sants, Barcelona
 Turia Gardens (Jardín del Turia), Valencia

United Kingdom

 Brampton Valley Way in Northamptonshire and Leicestershire, England
 Eastside City Park, Birmingham, England
 Hogsmill River Park, London, England
 Mile End Park, East London, England

North America

Canada
 Beltline Linear Park and West Toronto Railpath, Toronto, Ontario
 Grand Concourse (St. John's), Newfoundland: a walkway system with linear parks
 Meewasin Trail, Saskatoon, Saskatchewan
 Parc linéaire de la rivière Saint-Charles, Québec City, Québec
 Parc Linéaire Le P'tit Train du Nord, Saint-Jérôme - Mont-Laurier, Quebec.
 Strathcona Linear Park, Vancouver, British Columbia

United States
 Alewife Linear Park, Massachusetts
 Bloomingdale Trail (The 606), Chicago, Illinois
 Blue Ridge Parkway, North Carolina and Virginia
 Brickell Key Baywalk, Miami, Florida
 Buffalo Bayou Park, Houston, Texas
 Burnham Greenway, Chicago, Illinois
 Charles River Esplanade, Boston, Massachusetts
 Chesapeake and Ohio Canal National Historical Park, Washington, D.C., West Virginia, and Maryland 
Delaware and Raritan Canal State Park, Central New Jersey
 Dequindre Cut, Detroit, Michigan
 East Boston Greenway, Boston,  Massachusetts
 Eastern Parkway, New York City
 Elizabeth River Parkway, Union County, New Jersey
 Embarcadero, San Francisco, California
 Freeway Park, Seattle, Washington
 Grand Park, Los Angeles, California
Great Highway, San Francisco, California
 High Line, New York, New York
 Hollywood Central Park, Los Angeles, California
 Hoover-Mason Trestle, Bethlehem, Pennsylvania 
 Hudson River Park, New York, New York
 Indianapolis Cultural Trail, Indianapolis, Indiana
 James River Park System, Richmond, Virginia
 Little Sugar Creek Greenway, Charlotte, North Carolina
 Midtown Greenway and trails network of Minneapolis, Minnesota
 Mosholu Parkway, The Bronx, New York City
 Ocean Parkway, New York City
 Passaic River Parkway, Union County, New Jersey
 Pastor Willie James Ford, Sr. Linear Park, Deerfield Beach, Florida
 Pelham Parkway, The Bronx, New York City
 Rahway River Parkway, Union County, New Jersey
 Rose Kennedy Greenway, Boston, Massachusetts
 Riverfront Park (Arkansas River Trail), Little Rock, Arkansas
 Rotary Trail, Birmingham, Alabama
 Salesforce Park, San Francisco
 San Antonio River Walk, San Antonio, Texas
Stowe Recreation Path, Stowe, Vermont
 The Loop, Tucson, Arizona
 The Underline, Miami-Dade County, Florida
 Vanderbilt Motor Parkway, Queens, New York City
 Walkway over the Hudson State Historic Park, Poughkeepsie and Highland, New York
 Washington & Old Dominion Railroad Regional Park, Northern Virginia

Mexico
 Línea Verde, Aguascalientes

Asia

Hong Kong 
 Avenue of Stars, Hong Kong

Singapore 
 Rail Corridor, Singapore

Iran
Seyyed morteza linear park, kashmar

Israel
 Yarkon Park, Tel Aviv

Japan
 Odori Park, Sapporo

Philippines
 Plaza Moriones, Manila
 Camaligan River Park, Camaligan, Camarines Sur

Taiwan
Calligraphy Greenway, Taichung

South Korea
Seoullo 7017, Seoul

United Arab Emirates
Al zorah linear park, Ajman

Australia
 Stirling Linear Park, near Adelaide
 Sturt River Linear Park, near Adelaide
 The Goods Line, Sydney
 Torrens Linear Park, Adelaide

See also

 Boardwalk
 Footpath
 Foreshoreway
 Greenway (landscape)
 Promenade
 Trail
 Urban park
 Wildlife corridor

Notes

References

 
Parks
Greenways
Footpaths
Urban public parks
Landscape architecture
Land management
Urban studies and planning terminology
Sustainable urban planning
Types of thoroughfares